The 2000–01 UC Irvine Anteaters men's basketball team represented the University of California, Irvine during the 2000–01 NCAA Division I men's basketball season. The Anteaters were led by fourth year head coach Pat Douglass and played their home games at the Bren Events Center. They were members of the Big West Conference. They finished the season with a school record 25–5 and 15–1 in Big West play to win the Big West regular season championship. They advanced to the Big West Conference tournament where they lost to the Pacific Tigers. The Anteaters earned a bid to the National Invitation Tournament where they lost in the first round to the Tulsa Golden Hurricane.

Roster

Schedule

|-
!colspan=9 style=|Non-Conference Season

|-
!colspan=9 style=|Conference Season

|-
!colspan=9 style="background:#002244; color:#FFDE6C;"| Big West tournament

|-
!colspan=9 style="background:#002244; color:#FFDE6C;"| NIT

Source

References

UC Irvine Anteaters men's basketball seasons
UC Irvine
UC Irvine
UC Irvine Anteaters men's basketball team
UC Irvine Anteaters men's basketball team